San Giacomo may refer to the following:

Actors
Laura San Giacomo (born November 14, 1962) a film and television actress.

Churches 
 San Giacomo dell'Orio, Venice
 San Giacomo di Rialto, Venice
 San Giacomo degli Spagnuoli, Rome, aka Nostra Signora del Sacro Cuore

Places in Italy 
 San Giacomo degli Schiavoni, province of Campobasso
 San Giacomo delle Segnate, province of Mantua
 San Giacomo Filippo, province of Sondrio
 San Giacomo in Paludo, island north of the Venice Lagoon
 San Giacomo Vercellese, province of Vercelli
 San Giacomo (Valle Castellana), a locality within the commune of Valle Castellana, province of Teramo
 San Giacomo, a locality within the communes of Laives and Bolzano, the site of the Bolzano Airport